Joseph Ravaisou (11 November 1865 – 22 December 1925) was a French landscape painter.

Ravaisou was born in Bandol, Var.  In 1878 he moved to Aix-en-Provence to work as a school teacher, and subsequently became a music conductor and a music critic.

After seeing an exhibition in Paris with paintings by Camille Pissarro and Claude Monet, he returned to Aix and worked alongside Louise Germain. From 1899 to 1902 he also worked with Paul Cézanne, whom he admired.  He died at Aix, aged 70.

Some of his works are kept in the Musée Granet in Aix-en-Provence, as well as in Marseille, Martigues and Paris.

References

External links
Bastide Aixoise, by Joseph Ravaisou

1865 births
1925 deaths
People from Var (department)
19th-century French painters
French male painters
20th-century French painters
20th-century French male artists
19th-century French male artists